is a Japanese football player. He plays for Zweigen Kanazawa on loan from Cerezo Osaka. His father is Iwao Yamane.

Career
Towa Yamane joined J1 League club Cerezo Osaka in 2017. On 27 June 2019, Yamane was loaned out to Zweigen Kanazawa.

Club statistics
Updated to 2 January 2020.

References

External links
Profile at Cerezo Osaka

1999 births
Living people
Association football people from Hiroshima Prefecture
Japanese footballers
J1 League players
J2 League players
J3 League players
Cerezo Osaka players
Cerezo Osaka U-23 players
Zweigen Kanazawa players
Mito HollyHock players
Thespakusatsu Gunma players
Association football forwards